The year 2009 is the first year in the history of BAMMA, a mixed martial arts promotion based in the United Kingdom. In 2009 BAMMA held 1 event, BAMMA 1: The Fighting Premiership.

Events list

BAMMA 1: The Fighting Premiership

BAMMA 1: The Fighting Premiership was an event held on June 27, 2009 at the Room by the River in London, England, United Kingdom.

Results

References

BAMMA events
2009 in mixed martial arts